Charles Terlinden (1878—1972) was a Belgian historian, professor at the Catholic University of Louvain, and papal chamberlain.

Life
Terlinden was born in Schaerbeek on 6 July 1878. He studied law at Saint-Louis University Faculty in Brussels, and at the Faculty of Law of the Catholic University of Louvain. After completing a doctorate in law, he began historical studies under Alfred Cauchie, with a thesis on Pope Clement IX and the War of Candia (1904). He followed this in 1906 with a second thesis on William I of the Netherlands and the Catholic Church in Belgium, making him a triple doctor.

He was called up in 1914 and saw action at Melle. After the war he was a historical adviser to the Belgian delegation to the Paris Peace Conference, and in the aftermath was vocally critical of the way that Austria-Hungary had been dismembered.

From 1918 until his death he was Professor of Modern and Contemporary History at the Catholic University of Louvain (emeritus from 1948). During the Second World War he wrote a number of popularising works about strong women in Belgian history. From 1955 until his death he was president of the Belgian Historical Institute in Rome. He died in Brussels on 23 January 1972. Obituaries were published in the Revue belge de philologie et d'histoire (50, 1972, pp. 1061–1069), Revue belge d'histoire militaire (19, 1972, pp. 361–362), Bulletin de l'Institut historique belge de Rome (43, 1973, pp. V-XI), and Bulletin de la Commission royale d'Histoire (150, 1984, pp. 75–78).

Works
 The History of the Scheldt, London, 1920
 Histoire de la Belgique contemporaine, 2 vols., Brussels, 1929
 Histoire militaire des Belges, Brussels, 1931
 A travers notre histoire et nos gloires, Brussels, 1943
 L'Archiduchesse Isabelle, Brussels, 1943
 Princesses belges du passé, Brussels, 1943
 Figures de princesses, Brussels, 1944
 La Renaissance en Belgique, Brussels, 1945
 Impérialisme et équilibre, Brussels, 1952
 Carolus Quintus: Charles Quint, empereur des Deux Mondes, [Bruges], 1965

References

1878 births
1972 deaths
20th-century Belgian historians
Catholic University of Leuven (1834–1968) alumni
Academic staff of the Catholic University of Leuven (1834–1968)